John Steer (1928 – 20 February 2012) was Professor of the History of Art at Birkbeck College, University of London, from 1979 to his retirement in 1984. Subsequently, he was Emeritus Professor of the History of Art, University of London. He was a specialist in Venetian art.

Steer was the founder of the departments of art history at both Bristol and then St Andrews universities.

Steer received an Honorary Doctorate from Heriot-Watt University in 1991.

Selected publications
A concise history of Venetian painting. London: Thames and Hudson, 1970.
Alvise Vivarini: His art and influence. Cambridge: Cambridge University Press, 1982. 
Atlas of western art history: Artists, sites and movements from ancient Greece to the modern age. New York: Facts on File, c. 1994.

References

1928 births
2012 deaths
British art historians
Academics of Birkbeck, University of London
Academics of the University of Bristol
Academics of the University of Glasgow
Academics of the University of St Andrews
Alumni of Keble College, Oxford
Alumni of the Courtauld Institute of Art